The 2023 SAFF U-16 Championship will be the 8th edition of the SAFF U-17 Championship, an international football competition for men's under-17 national teams organized by South Asian Football Federation (SAFF).

India is the defending champion. They have won previous season title by beating Nepal 4−0 on 14 September 2022.

Venue
All matches are being held in Bhutan.

Officials

Participating teams

Players' eligibility
Players born on or after 1 January 2007, are eligible to compete in the tournament. Each team has to register a squad of minimum 16 players and maximum 23 players, minimum two of whom must be goalkeepers.

Group stage
Times listed are UTC+06:00 Bhutan Time.

Tiebreakers
Teams are ranked according to points (3 points for a win, 1 point for a draw, 0 points for a loss), and if tied on points, the following tiebreaking criteria are applied, in the order given, to determine the rankings.
Points in head-to-head matches among tied teams;
Goal difference in head-to-head matches among tied teams;
Goals scored in head-to-head matches among tied teams;
If more than two teams are tied, and after applying all head-to-head criteria above, a subset of teams are still tied, all head-to-head criteria above are reapplied exclusively to this subset of teams;
Goal difference in all group matches;
Goals scored in all group matches;
Penalty shoot-out if only two teams are tied and they met in the last round of the group;
Disciplinary points (yellow card = 1 point, red card as a result of two yellow cards = 3 points, direct red card = 3 points, yellow card followed by direct red card = 4 points);
Drawing of lots.

See also
 2023 SAFF Championship
 2023 SAFF U-19 Championship
 2023 SAFF U-17 Women's Championship
 2023 SAFF U-20 Women's Championship

References 

SAFF